Sikaiana is a genus of derbid planthoppers in the family Derbidae. There are about 17 described species in Sikaiana.

Species
These 17 species belong to the genus Sikaiana:

 Sikaiana africana Muir, 1926 c g
 Sikaiana albomaculata (Distant, 1917) c g
 Sikaiana caenosa Muir, 1913 c g
 Sikaiana clymene Muir, 1913 c g
 Sikaiana flammeivittata Fennah, 1950 c g
 Sikaiana fulva Muir, 1913 c g
 Sikaiana harti Metcalf, 1923 c g b
 Sikaiana hyalinata Distant, 1907 c g
 Sikaiana laelaps Fennah, 1970 c g
 Sikaiana lycotas Fennah, 1969 c g
 Sikaiana maculosa Distant, 1907 c g
 Sikaiana makii Muir, 1915 c g
 Sikaiana nesiope Kirkaldy, 1907 c g
 Sikaiana nigrimaculata Muir, 1913 c g
 Sikaiana palaui Fennah, 1956 c g
 Sikaiana straminea Muir, 1913 c g
 Sikaiana vitriceps Muir, 1917 c g

Data sources: i = ITIS, c = Catalogue of Life, g = GBIF, b = Bugguide.net

References

Further reading

External links

 

Otiocerinae
Auchenorrhyncha genera